Live at Newport is the fifth and first live album by jazz pianist McCoy Tyner. It features performances from bassist Bob Cranshaw and drummer Mickey Roker, with trumpeter Clark Terry and alto saxophonist Charlie Mariano appearing on three of the five tracks.

Reception
The Allmusic review by Stephen Thomas Erlewine states that "It's straight-ahead hard bop in the best possible sense—accessible but stimulating, engaging and vibrant from beginning to end".

Track listing
 "Newport Romp" (McCoy Tyner) – 7:45  
 "My Funny Valentine" (Lorenz Hart, Richard Rodgers) – 8:03  
 "All of You" (Cole Porter) – 6:24  
 "Monk's Blues" (Tyner) – 7:14  
 "Woody 'n' You" (Dizzy Gillespie) – 9:00

Personnel
McCoy Tyner – piano
Bob Cranshaw – bass 
Mickey Roker – drums
Clark Terry – trumpet (tracks 1, 2 & 5)
Charlie Mariano – alto saxophone (tracks 1, 2 & 5)

References

Albums recorded at the Newport Jazz Festival
1964 live albums
McCoy Tyner live albums
Albums produced by Bob Thiele
Impulse! Records live albums
1963 in Rhode Island